The Terrible or el Terrible is an epithet applied to:

 Afonso de Albuquerque (c. 1453–1515), Portuguese general, admiral and empire builder
 Ants Kaljurand (1917–1951), Estonian anti-Soviet guerrilla fighter
 Charles the Bold (1433–1477), last Valois Duke of Burgundy
 John III the Terrible (1521–1574), Voivode of Moldavia
 Ivan the Terrible (1530–1584), Tsar of Russia
 Ivan the Terrible (disambiguation), various other people
 Shingas (fl. 1740–1763), a Native American warrior and leader during the French and Indian Wars
 Iván Calderón (baseball) (1962–003), Puerto Rican Major League Baseball player
 Ralph Toohy (1926–1999), Canadian Football League player
 Roger Touhy (1898–1959) and his brother Tommy Touhy, American gangsters in Chicago
 "Abdul the Terrible", nickname given a Turkish sniper assigned to kill Chinese-Australian sniper Billy Sing during World War I

In fiction and mythology: 
 Humbaba, a giant in Akkadian mythology
 Ivy the Terrible, a character in The Beano comic strip
 Trigon (comics), a DC Comics villain

See also
 El Terrible, ring name of Mexican wrestler Damián Gutiérrez Hernández (born 1976)
 El Terrible, ring name of Mexican boxer Erik Morales (born 1976)
 El Terrible, nickname of Mexican football goalkeeper Iván Vázquez Mellado (born 1982)
 Jason the Terrible, ring name of wrestler Karl Moffat (born 1960)
 Tiny the Terrible, ring name of wrestler Douglas Allen Tunstall Jr.
 Ted Lindsay (1925–2019), Canadian Hall-of-Fame ice hockey player nicknamed "Terrible Ted"

Lists of people by epithet